Pielești is a commune in Dolj County, Oltenia, Romania with a population of 6,766 people. It is composed of three villages: Câmpeni, Lânga and Pielești.

References

Communes in Dolj County
Localities in Oltenia